Cork Mid was a Dáil constituency represented in Dáil Éireann, the lower house of the Oireachtas (the Irish legislature) from 1961 to 1981. The constituency was represented by 4 deputies (Teachtaí Dála, commonly known as TDs) from 1961 to 1977, and then 5 from 1977 until its abolition in 1981. The method of election was proportional representation by means of the single transferable vote (PR-STV).

Boundaries
From 1961 to 1969, its boundaries were defined as: "The administrative county of Cork except the portions thereof which are comprised in the borough constituency of Cork and the county constituencies of North-East Cork and South-West Cork."

From 1961 to 1977, its boundaries were defined as: "The administrative county of Cork except the portions thereof which are comprised in the borough constituency of Cork and the county constituencies of North-East Cork, South-West Cork and South Kerry."

From 1977 to 1981, its boundaries were defined as: "The administrative county of Cork, except the parts thereof which are comprised in the constituencies of Cork North-East, Cork South-West and Kerry South; and the following wards in the county borough of Cork: Bishopstown E, Gillabbey B, Gillabbey C, Glasheen A, Glasheen B, Glasheen C, Pouladuff A, Pouladuff B, The Lough, Togher A, Togher B."

TDs

Elections

1977 general election

1973 general election

1972 by-election
Following the death of Fianna Fáil TD Paddy Forde on 13 May 1972, a by-election was held on 2 August 1972. The seat was won by the Fianna Fáil candidate Gene Fitzgerald.

1969 general election

1965 general election

1965 by-election
Following the death of Labour Party TD Dan Desmond on 9 December 1964, a by-election was held on 10 March 1965. The seat was won by the Labour Party candidate Eileen Desmond, widow of the deceased TD.

1961 general election

See also
Dáil constituencies
Politics of the Republic of Ireland
Historic Dáil constituencies
Elections in the Republic of Ireland

References

External links
 Oireachtas Members Database

Historic constituencies in County Cork
Dáil constituencies in the Republic of Ireland (historic)
1961 establishments in Ireland
1981 disestablishments in Ireland
Constituencies established in 1961
Constituencies disestablished in 1981